Dandekar is a surname. Notable people with the surname include:

Anusha Dandekar, Indo-Australian MTV VJ, actress and singer
Dilip Dandekar, chairman and managing director of Kokuyo Camlin Ltd.
Gopal Nilkanth Dandekar (1916–1998), Indian Marathi language writer
Kala Dandekar, fictional character, Sense8 TV series
Morobhatt Dandekar (fl. 1830s), Hindu apologist from Bombay, India
Ramchandra Narayan Dandekar (1909–2001), Indian Vedic scholar
Shankar Vaman Dandekar (1896–1969), Indian philosopher
Shibani Dandekar, an Indian singer, actress, anchor and model
Swati Dandekar, American politician